Da'wah is a sub-district located in Manakhah District, Sana'a Governorate, Yemen. Da'wah had a population of 1624 according to the 2004 census.

References 

Sub-districts in Manakhah District